"I Don't Want to Take a Chance" is a single released by Mary Wells in 1961 on the Motown label. It was the second single release from Wells, who hit the charts with her Jackie Wilson-esque "Bye Bye Baby".

While that song was able to reach the top fifty of the pop singles chart, the string-laden follow-up performed better reaching number thirty-three on the US pop chart and peaking at number-nine on the R&B singles chart.

The song became one of the first nationally released Motown singles to reach the top forty on the pop chart after Barrett Strong's "Money (That's What I Want)" and The Miracles' "Shop Around".

Personnel
Vocal by Mary Wells
Instrumentation by The Funk Brothers
Strings played by assorted musicians
Written by Berry Gordy and William "Mickey" Stevenson
Produced by Berry Gordy

References

1961 singles
Mary Wells songs
Motown singles
Songs written by Berry Gordy
Songs written by William "Mickey" Stevenson
Song recordings produced by Berry Gordy
1961 songs